was a town located in Naka District, Shimane Prefecture, Japan.

As of 2003, the town had an estimated population of 5,066 and a density of 30.83 persons per km². The total area was 164.30 km².

On October 1, 2005, Kanagi, along with the towns of Asahi and Misumi, and the village of Yasaka (all from Naka District), was merged into the expanded city of Hamada.

References

Dissolved municipalities of Shimane Prefecture